The following is a list of ethnic slurs or ethnophaulisms or ethnic epithets that are, or have been, used as insinuations or allegations about members of a given ethnicity or racial group or to refer to them in a derogatory, pejorative, or otherwise insulting manner.

Some of the terms listed below (such as "gringo", "yank", etc.) can be used in casual speech without any intention of causing offense. The connotation of a term and prevalence of its use as a pejorative or neutral descriptor varies over time and by geography.

For the purposes of this list, an ethnic slur is a term designed to insult others on the basis of race, ethnicity, or nationality. Each term is listed followed by its country or region of usage, a definition, and a reference to that term.

Ethnic slurs may also be produced as a racial epithet by combining a general-purpose insult with the name of ethnicity, such as "dirty Jew", "Russian pig", etc. Other common insulting modifiers include "dog", "filthy", etc. However, such terms are not included in this list.

A

B

C

D

E

F

G

H

I

J

K

L

M

N

O

P

Q

R

S

T

U

V

W

X

Y

Z

See also

 :Category:Sex- and gender-related slurs
 Fighting words
 Graphic pejoratives in written Chinese
 Hate speech
 List of disability-related terms with negative connotations
 List of ethnic group names used as insults
 List of ethnic slurs by ethnicity
 List of LGBT slang terms
 List of regional nicknames
 List of religious slurs
 List of terms used for Germans
 Lists of pejorative terms for people
 Term of disparagement
 Xenophobia
 Xenophobia in the United States
 Xenophobia and racism related to the COVID-19 pandemic
 wikt:Category:English ethnic slurs
 Wiktionary category: English derogatory terms
 wikt:Appendix:English terms for outsiders

References

Bibliography

 
 
 
 
 
 
 
 
 
 South Africa Lexicon 2019. Available at: https://static1.squarespace.com/static/54257189e4b0ac0d5fca1566/t/5cc0a0682be8f70001f10300/1556127851372/SouthAfricaLexicon2019_v3.pdf

Further reading
 Adhikari, Mohamed, editor. Burdened by Race: Coloured Identities in Southern Africa. UCT Press, 2013, pp. 69, 124, 203 ISBN 978-1-92051-660-4 https://library.oapen.org/bitstream/id/c0a95c41-a983-49fc-ac1f-7720d607340d/628130.pdf. 
 Burchfield, Robert. "Dictionaries and Ethnic Sensibilities." In The State of the Language, ed. Leonard Michaels and Christopher Ricks, University of California Press, 1980, pp. 15–23.
 Croom, Adam M. "Racial Epithets: What We Say and Mean by Them". Dialogue 51 (1):34–45 (2008)
 Henderson, Anita. "What's in a Slur?" American Speech, Volume 78, Number 1, Spring 2003, pp. 52–74 in Project MUSE
 Kennedy, Randall. Nigger: The Strange Career of a Troublesome Word (Pantheon, 2002)
 Mencken, H. L. "Designations for Colored Folk." American Speech, 1944. 19: 161–74.
 Mathabane, M. (1986). Kaffir Boy: The True Story of a Black Youth's Coming of Age in Apartheid South Africa. Simon & Schuster. (Chapter 2)
 Wachal, Robert S. "Taboo and Not Taboo: That Is the Question." American Speech, 2002. vol. 77: 195–206.

Dictionaries
 Erin McKean, ed. The New Oxford American Dictionary, second edition. (Oxford University Press, 2005)
 Eric Partridge, A Dictionary of Slang and Unconventional English (2002)
 John A. Simpson, Oxford English Dictionary Additions Series. 
 Catherine Soanes and Angus Stevenson, ed. The Concise Oxford English Dictionary. (Oxford University Press, 2004)

 
Ethnic Slurs
Profanity
Ethnic slurs
Lists of pejorative terms for people